Xianggang Road is a transfer station on the Wuhan Metro. It entered revenue service on December 28, 2015. It is located in Jiang'an District. This station is an interchange between Line 3, Line 6 and Line 7.

Station layout

Gallery

References

Wuhan Metro stations
Line 3, Wuhan Metro
Line 6, Wuhan Metro
Line 7, Wuhan Metro
Railway stations in China opened in 2015